Jenny Waelder Hall (1898–1989) was a pioneer of child psychoanalysis. She was analysed by Sigmund Freud and supervised by Anna Freud.

References

External links
 The Jenny Waelder-Hall Center for Children

American women psychologists
20th-century American psychologists
1898 births
1989 deaths
20th-century American women
University of Vienna alumni
20th-century American people